Events from the year 1808 in France.

Incumbents
 Emperor – Napoleon I

Events
22 January - The Bragança Portuguese Royal Family arrives in Brazil, having fled the French army.
2 February - French troops occupy Papal States (Vatican).
February - Under the pretext of reinforcing the Franco-Spanish army occupying Portugal, French troops begin filing into Spain.
29 February - A French column, disguised as a convoy of wounded, takes Barcelona by convincing the authorities to open the city's gates.
23 March - Madrid is occupied by French forces.
2 May - Dos de Mayo Uprising, the people of Madrid rebel against the occupation of the city by French troops, provoking a brutal repression by the French.
5 May - Napoleon forces the Spanish royal family to abdicate and hands the throne to his brother Joseph.
25 May - Asturias rises up in arms, casting out its French governor.
4 June - Peninsular War: Battle of El Bruc, Spanish victory over French forces.
12 June - Peninsular War: Battle of Cabezón, decisive French victory over Spanish forces.
15 June - Peninsular War: Siege of Saragossa begins, as French forces repeatedly attack the city.
14 July - Peninsular War: Battle of Medina del Rio Seco, crushing defeat of Spanish army by the French.
18 July-22 July - Peninsular War: Battle of Bailén, Spanish forces surround the French and compel the surrender of almost 18,000 men. It was the worst disaster suffered by the French during the Iberian campaign.
30 July - Peninsular War: French forces massacre the population of Évora.
13 August - Peninsular War: Siege of Saragossa ends in defeat for the French who were forced to lift the siege and retreat.
17 August - Peninsular War: Battle of Roliça, British victory over the French, first battle fought by the British army during the war.
20 August - Peninsular War: Battle of Vimeiro, Anglo-Portuguese victory over French forces.
30 August - Peninsular War: Convention of Sintra signed, by which the defeated French are allowed to evacuate their troops from Portugal without further conflict.
27 September - Congress of Erfurt, between Emperor Napoleon I and Tsar Alexander I begins.
14 October - Congress of Erfurt ends.
31 October - Peninsular War: Battle of Zornoza, indecisive battle between French and Spanish forces.
4 November - Napoleon creates the département of Tarn-et-Garonne''.
5 November - Peninsular War: Battle of Valmaseda, Spanish victory over French forces.
7 November - Peninsular War: Battle of Burgos, French victory over Spanish forces.
10 November-11 November - Peninsular War: Battle of Espinosa, French victory over Spanish forces.
23 November - Peninsular War: Battle of Tudela, French victory over Spanish forces.
30 November - Peninsular War: Battle of Somosierra, outnumbered Spanish force fails to prevent Napoleon from moving on Madrid.
1 December - Peninsular War: French patrols reach the outskirts of Madrid.
4 December - Peninsular War: Madrid surrenders and French enter the city for the second time that year.
21 December - Peninsular War: Battle of Sahagún, British victory over French forces.

Births

January to June
4 February - Charles-Pierre Denonvilliers, surgeon (died 1872)
26 February - Honoré Daumier, printmaker, caricaturist, painter and sculptor (died 1879)
20 March - Antoine Étex, sculptor, painter and architect (died 1888)
20 April - Napoleon III of France, first President of the French Republic and the only emperor of the Second French Empire (died 1873)
15 May - Marie Dominique Bouix, Jesuit canon lawyer (died 1870)
22 May - Gérard de Nerval, poet, essayist and translator (died 1855)
30 May - Felix-Joseph Barbelin, Jesuit influential in the development of the Catholic community in Philadelphia (died 1869)
8 June - Etienne-Paulin Gagne, poet, essayist, lawyer, politician, inventor, and eccentric (died 1876)
13 June - Patrice de Mac-Mahon, duc de Magenta, general and politician, first president of the Third Republic (died 1893)

July to December
5 July - Jacques Claude Demogeot, man of letters (died 1894)
30 August - Jean-Charles Chenu, physician and naturalist (died 1879)
28 September - Jean Pierre Pellissier, missionary to Southern Africa (died 1867)
2 November - Jules Amédée Barbey d'Aurevilly, novelist and short story writer (died 1889)

Deaths
1 April - Jean-Baptiste Dubois de Jancigny, French agronomist and scientist (born 1753)
26 April - Jean-Baptiste Pillement, painter and designer (born 1728)
30 May - Louis-Charles, Count of Beaujolais, younger brother of King Louis-Philippe I of the French (born 1779)
10 June - Jean-Baptiste de Belloy, Archbishop of Paris and Cardinal (born 1709)
17 June - Louis-Joseph de Laval-Montmorency, Cardinal (born 1724)
23 July - François-Hippolyte Barthélémon, composer and violinist (born 1741)
6 September - Louis-Pierre Anquetil, historian (born 1723)

See also

References

1800s in France